Qala (Music from the Netflix Film) is the soundtrack accompanying the 2022 film of the same name released on 11 November 2022 by Sony Music India. The album featured six tracks — five of them being composed by Amit Trivedi and the sixth song guest composed by Sagar Desai, who also scored the film's background music. Lyrics for the songs were written by Amitabh Bhattacharya, Swanand Kirkire, Varun Grover, Kausar Munir, Anvitaa Dutt and excerpts from Sant Kabir's poems being included. Since the film is set in the 1940s, Dutt and Trivedi had to use ethnic classical instrumentation entirely to reflect that period. The album received rave response from music critics and listeners.

Background 
Qala is set in the 1940s, which was the early days of the Hindi film industry. Trivedi had challenged to create melodies that feels true to the vintage Hindi film music, but not old-fashioned to the contemporary music listeners. Hence, to prepare for the score, he listened to the musical works of C. Ramchandra, S. D. Burman and Naushad, though he had not inspired a particular composer or an album. His focus is mainly, how he was going to do justice to the story, that Dutt had written, as "it is a mother-daughter story, and there’s a real haunting quality to it". In an interview to Swati Chopra of The Quint, when asked about the soundtrack being inspired from the music of Guru Dutt's filmography, Dutt denied the same as "We never specifically talked about any particular director or composer while working on the songs because we didn't want anybody to be influenced. We only spoke about the character and the story."

The songs were composed within three days when Trivedi was on a staycation in Goa, with Dutt and lyricist Swanand Kirkire. Though in an interview, Trivedi admitting on how it was hard to compose for retro-classical style of music, he completed scoring for the album in a short span of time. Initially, the narration of the script went for a day, whereas the scoring process took place within two days. Trivedi, while launching his debut studio album Jadu Salona in Spotify, Trivedi admitted that he almost gave up on scoring the film, but turned back and composed the score for the film.

To match the story and setting of early 1940s, the soundtrack was devoid of electronic instruments and Trivedi mostly used accordion, tabla, dholak, rebab, sitar, reflecting the ethnic classical music. The songs were sung by Sireesha Bhagavatula and Shahid Mallya, who were the playback singers for Qala (Tripti Dimri) and Jagan (Babil Khan). Mallya explained on his contribution to the film, saying "Qala let me tap into a space that was not explored by me on a commercial platform. Hence, singing for this film was like a golden opportunity that I could never have missed out on. Well, it could not have been possible if not for the support that Amit Trivedi gave me. So, I just want to thank him for putting his faith in me." Bengaluru-based musician Iman Das additionally provided vocals for two of the tracks in the film, following his friendship with Sagar Desai, who guest composed the soundtrack and background score.

Songs 
Both Dutt and Trivedi inspired the picturization of the songs through her story narration, imagining how the sequences should be shot. The ballad song "Shauq" depicts the fruition of love between Qala's mother, Urmila Manjushree (Swastika Mukherjee) and Chandan Lal Sanyal (Samir Kochhar), an abusive singer-record executive, where Sanyal asks Urmila to grant her sexual favours in exchange for launching Jagan as a musician, to which Urmila obliges, that eventually led to the downfall of both Qala, Jagan and Urmi in the end. Trivedi exclaimed that Dutt drew a visual for the song, where the characters are in the boat at night and the Howrah Bridge is visible, adding "There’s an obvious 'O Majhi Re' influence over any boat song. It really helped me catch the mood of the situation." "Phero Na Najariya" is described as a "song of redemption for Qala" and "Nirbhau Nirvair" portraying the competition between Qala and Jagan. "Udh Jayega" is termed as an "imagery full of death and freedom", which plays after Jagan's death. Though it picturised the beginning of Jagan's downfall, it also had a sense of liberation and freedom.

Analysing the music, Firstpost writer Deepansh Duggal considered "Ghodey Pe Sawaar" as a "sharp critique of overbearing heroes and male actors who normalised stalking in Hindi songs by violating the consent of the actress, often portraying it as harmless fun"; it was played as Qala's rebellion song against Sanyal, who forces her to grant him sexual favours. In the track, Trivedi used the accordion to the beats of a galloping horse — a hat tip to O. P. Nayyar's use of trotting horse in "Piya Piya Piya Mera Jiya Pukare"; the intention is to make the song "more nostalgic and playful". Dutt said that for the song, she told Amitabh Bhattacharya, that "it's a playback singer who doesn't belong to Qala's world; but to the film world of that time," narrating the concept of the track, which made it perfect. For the song, Anushka Sharma, the film's producer featured herself in a cameo role as actress Devika, saying that "I did this song for the fun of it. No other reason whatsoever and I enjoyed myself doing it! I had fun playing a yesteryears actress and I’m really happy to see the reactions from people for my special appearance. I wasn’t expecting that people would like it so much but I’m glad that they have and are happy to see me on screen after sometime."

Although "Rubaiyaan" was recorded as a part of the soundtrack, it could not be used in the final film.

Track listing

Reception 
Qala received positive response from music listeners, who highlighted it as one of the best soundtracks of 2022. Deepansh Duggal, reviewed the soundtrack, saying "music is a character and has a distinct identity of its own. There are times when it acts like an oracle prophesying future events. It also plays the role of a keen observer who has a birds eye view of the events in the film and how they unfold which makes it privy to the innermost feelings of the characters. In Qala's soundtrack, no lyric or verse is accidental. Music is a character in Qala which has a distinct identity of its own. There are times when it acts like an oracle prophesying future events." Music critic Vipin Nair wrote "Anvitaa Dutt makes up for the lack of songs in her debut movie, in style! And in a year that has seen Amit Trivedi deliver in quantity but not so much in quality, it is heartening to finally see a soundtrack that shows us what the man can produce when he is really..on song!"

Manjeet Singh of Leisure Byte wrote "music is indeed the core element of the film and it sure does reflect in the meticulously crafted album". Bhavya Sadhwani of India Times wrote "The songs are original and authentic and yet they have tried to recreate the gold era Indian music which sounds familiar and comforting to most". Anish Mohanty of Planet Bollywood wrote "Qala is that album that serves as a reminder of the fact that Amit Trivedi is a gifted composer who just needs the right director (and perhaps, adequate time and space) to bring the best out of him. It had been a while since the composer delivered an album that could be described as a brilliant effort. Amit creates a bunch of sparkling emotions while ensuring his music remains in sync with the era the film is set in. A special mention must also be made of Sagar Desai who composes one of the most spectacular songs on the album. Here’s hoping one gets to hear his more often in mainstream Hindi cinema." In a mixed review, Roktim Rajpal of India Today wrote "Amit Trivedi tunes, however, prove to be a mixed bag. While the songs manage to hold our attention, they aren’t really all that catchy."

It has been widely reviewed and praised by listeners, especially from the new-age listeners appreciating the "transcendental music and lyrics". The track "Ghodey Pe Sawaar" became popular after its release, leading to several cover versions of fans and celebrities, including the likes of Madhuri Dixit. A fan-made male version of the song was performed by music enthusiast and singer Jainam Barot. However, this invoked criticism from certain listeners as it deviated from the major context of the song — which is based on a women's consent.

Accolades

References 

2022 soundtrack albums